Blount Township is a township in Vermilion County, Illinois, USA.  As of the 2010 census, its population was 3,428 and it contained 1,475 housing units.

History
Blount Township was established in 1856 from portions of Newell and Pilot townships. It was originally named after John C. Frémont, the Republican candidate for president that year. Democrats objected, and the township was named after early settler Abraham Blount.

Geography
The northwestern portion of the county seat of Danville extends into the southeast portion of the township, as does a portion of Lake Vermilion.

Cities and towns
 Danville, the county seat (northwest edge)

Extinct towns
 Grumle Corner
 Higginsville
 Jamesburg
 Johnsonville
 Moore's Corner
 Snider
 Vernal

Adjacent townships
 South Ross Township (northeast)
 Newell Township (east)
 Danville Township (southeast)
 Catlin Township (south)
 Oakwood Township (southwest)
 Pilot Township (west)
 Middlefork Township (northwest)

Cemeteries
The township contains eleven cemeteries: Bethel, Dodson, Fairchild, Gordon, Higginsville, Johnson, New Salem, Newell Grove, Pentecost, Porter, Snider and Thurman.

Major highways
  U.S. Route 136
  Illinois State Route 1

Airports and landing strips
 Flying B Ranch Airport
 Melody Field

Demographics

School districts
 Bismarck Henning Consolidated Unit School District
 Danville Community Consolidated School District 118
 Oakwood Community Unit School District 76

Political districts
 Illinois' 15th congressional district
 State House District 104
 State Senate District 52

References
 U.S. Board on Geographic Names (GNIS)
 United States Census Bureau 2007 TIGER/Line Shapefiles

External links
 US-Counties.com
 City-Data.com
 Illinois State Archives

Townships in Vermilion County, Illinois
Townships in Illinois